Kantipur Engineering College (KEC) (Nepali: कान्तिपुर इन्जिनियरीङ कलेज), affiliated to Tribhuvan University, Nepal, is an engineering college in Dhapakhel, Lalitpur, Nepal. The college offers courses in Bachelor of Engineering which are Computer Engineering, Electronics and Communication Engineering and Civil Engineering.

International links
The college organized the 9th International Conference on Software, Knowledge, Information Management & Applications SKIMA 15–17 December 2015 in Kathmandu, Nepal. In 2008, KEC organized the SKIMA conference in Kathmandu, Nepal.

The college is associated with FUSION (Featured eUrope and South asIa mObility Network), cLINK, SMARTLINK projects which are funded under Erasmus Mundus Action 2 (EMA2). These projects focus on fostering international cooperation between European Higher Education Institutions (HEIs) and HEIs in emerging Asian countries through the promotion of mobility at all level of studies and training for students, PhD candidates, post-doctoral researchers, academics and administrative staff.

KEC aims to mobilise 160 students, researchers and staff in between Asia to Europe under current SMARTLINK project. The SmartLink cooperation will cover disciplines with a strong focus on research and training in the field of smart technologies for a wide range of application areas to address research and technological challenges.

Clubs 
There are three clubs in this college: Computer Club, Civil Club and Electronics Club formed with the motive to help in the all-round development of the students. All these clubs conduct their activities under their respective departments.

Scholarships 
Kantipur Engineering College provides number of scholarship to the students on the basis of merit.5% of seats in all the faculties are allocated as full scholarship (for 4 years) where student studies under IOE regular fees, while another 5% are awarded with semester scholarship where the tuition fee is waived for the semester.

See also 
 List of universities and colleges in Nepal

References

1998 establishments in Nepal
Educational institutions established in 1998
Engineering universities and colleges in Nepal
Lalitpur District, Nepal